Yn Pabyr Seyr is the newsletter of , the Manx pro-independence organisation, and publicises their policies, views and comments.

It has been distributed at least twice a year since 1990. The archive of back-issues available on line is being updated on an ongoing basis. Although its title is in Manx, the majority of content is in English.

Its politics lean towards the left and include criticism of neo-conservative capitalism on the Isle of Man.

References

External links
 online

Manx nationalism
Newspapers published in the Isle of Man
Politics of the Isle of Man
Separatism in the Isle of Man
Manx words and phrases
1990 establishments in the Isle of Man
Publications established in 1990